Michael Phillips  (Chinese name as 费立鹏) is a prominent Canadian psychiatrist known for his work in mental illness and suicide prevention. He resides in Shanghai, China.

References
 https://web.archive.org/web/20050415201037/http://mbhs.bergtraum.k12.ny.us/cybereng/nyt/china-female-suicide.htm
 
 https://www.usatoday.com/news/world/2002-12-03-china-suicide-usat_x.htm
 http://www.msnbc.com/news/994225.asp
 http://www.chinadaily.com.cn/english/doc/2004-10/09/content_380743.htm
 http://www.csmonitor.com/2004/1206/p07s01-woap.html

Year of birth missing (living people)
Living people
Canadian psychiatrists